Blood of the Martyrs is an American Christian metal band from Farmville, Virginia, formed in 2007, and currently has two official studio albums.

History

Formation and Once More, with Feeling

The band formed in late-2007 by bassist Bobby Huotari (original drummer) in the small town of Farmville, Virginia. Since its formation Blood of the Martyrs has undergone numerous line-up changes making Huotari the only original member of the band. Blood of the Martyrs has gained a reputation as a hard-working DIY act, who, has completed numerous self booked and managed tours since the release of their debut album, Once More, with Feeling, which was recorded at Pendlewood Studios in Columbus, Ohio, and was released April 2011.

Line-up changes and Completionist

After various tours spanning across 30+ states of the U.S and a cover of the Thirty Seconds to Mars song "The Kill" was released on November 23, 2011. The band announced on August 17, 2012, that they were working on a new album and released the single and video for the song "Colonel Gentleman". Much wasn't heard about the album, until the song "The Action Man" (featuring Karl Schubach of Misery Signals) was released on June 14, 2013. The band's second album, Completionist, was released independently on October 4, 2013, and was produced by Jamie King, who has worked with musical giants including Between the Buried and Me and For Today. The album featured a re-recorded version of "Colonel Gentleman" with Micah Kinard of Oh, Sleeper on guest vocals and also had an updated version of the demo "Semper Fidelis Tyrannosauruses".

Blood of the Martyrs has  garnered an extensive touring history despite being a largely independent band, touring with numerous artist off of Facedown Records, Solid State Records, Rise Records, InVogue Records, Victory Records, Tribunal Records, as well as other unsigned acts.

New vocalist and Endgame

In early 2014 the band announced that they had started to write new music. The band announced that they would be releasing an updated version of "Lady Nightshade" from their debut album as a single for free download. The single was released on August 15 and featured touring vocalist Eric Hendricks. The band began releasing song teasers from their upcoming album, though a permanent vocalist had not been announced at the time; Jason Wilkins, former vocalist for Gethsemane, was later announced as the band's new vocalist in 2015. On January 22, 2016, Blood of the Martyrs premiered a video for their new song "The Devil's Grip", the lead single from their upcoming EP Endgame. On February 14 the band released the second single from Endgame, titled "Dr. Killinger".

Style
Blood of the Martyrs is a heavy based band and is heavily influenced by the metalcore and deathcore subgenres while incorporating elements of electronic music and symphonic metal into their songs.
They are well known for their high live energy and performance.

Members
Current
Bobby Huotari – bass, backing vocals (2011–present); drums (2007–2011)
David Sanders – guitars (2012–present)
Michael "Pak Man" Pak – drums (2012–present)
Jason Wilkins – lead vocals (2015–present)

Former
Lee Zook – lead vocals, keyboards (2008–2014)
Nathan Stables – bass (2007–2009)
Hayden Caldwell – guitars (2010–2011)
Brian Paulette – guitars (2009–2012)
Chris Oberholtzer – guitars (2011–2012)
Tyler Ferrell – drums (2011–2012)

Touring musicians
Travis Lilley – bass (2010–2011)
Eric Hendricks – lead vocals (2014)
Jay Hathaway – guitars (2012–2013)

Timeline

Discography

Studio albums
Once More, with Feeling  (2011)
Completionist (2013)

Music videos

Singles

Extended plays
Pendlewood Studios (2010)
Endgame (2016)

References

External links
 Blood of the Martyrs on Last.fm

American deathcore musical groups
American Christian metal musical groups
American electronic music groups
American symphonic metal musical groups
Heavy metal musical groups from Virginia
Musical groups established in 2007